Aaron Joseph Bernstine (born July 2, 1984) is an American politician and current representative for the 8th district in the Pennsylvania House of Representatives. He is a member of the Republican Party, having previously represented the 10th district.

Early life and education
Bernstine was born on July 2, 1984 and was raised in western Pennsylvania. He graduated from Union Area High School in 2003, and earned an undergraduate business degree in Marketing from Pennsylvania State University and a Master of Business Administration degree in Finance and International Business from the University of Pittsburgh in 2006 and 2013, respectively.

Political career
Bernstine began his political career when he defeated incumbent Jaret Gibbons for the 10th District seat in the Pennsylvania House of Representatives with 58% of the vote.

Following redistricting in 2021, Bernstine was moved from the 10th District to the 8th District.

Bernstine is a member of the Pennsylvania State Freedom Caucus.

Tenure
In 2020, Bernstine was among 26 Pennsylvania House Republicans who called for the reversal of Joe Biden's certification as the winner of Pennsylvania's electoral votes in the 2020 United States presidential election, citing false claims of election irregularities.

Committee assignments 
2017-18
Aging and Older Adult Services
Finance
Health
Game and Fisheries

2019-20
 Commerce
 Game & Fisheries
 Health
 Insurance

2021-22
 Commerce
 Game & Fisheries
 Health
 Insurance

Electoral history

|-
! style="background-color: #800080; width: 2px;" |
| style="width: 130px" | Democratic/Republican
|               | Aaron Bernstine (incumbent)
| align="right" | 16,090
| align="right" | 77.98%
|-

References

|-

1984 births
Living people
Republican Party members of the Pennsylvania House of Representatives
21st-century American politicians
University of Pittsburgh alumni